Afrixalus leucostictus is a species of frog in the family Hyperoliidae. It is endemic to eastern and central Democratic Republic of the Congo. Its relationship with Afrixalus  equatorialis is not fully understood. Common names Makese banana frog and speckled spiny reed frog have been proposed for it.

Description
Adult males measure  and adult females  in snout–vent length. The snout is relatively short. The dorsal pattern varies from nearly absent to quite contrasting, but less so than in A. equatorialis (notice that the contrast is known to vary with light and humidity). The ventrum is greyish or violet; the gular disc might be yellowish. The tibia lack pattern.

Habitat and conservation
It is associated with stagnant pools, its presumed breeding habitat.

A. leucostictus  is a poorly known but widely distributed species. It is not threatened overall, although local populations probably suffer from habitat loss caused by agricultural encroachment, expanding human settlements, and wood extraction. It is present at least in the Virunga National Park.

References

leucostictus
Frogs of Africa
Amphibians of the Democratic Republic of the Congo
Endemic fauna of the Democratic Republic of the Congo
Amphibians described in 1950
Taxa named by Raymond Laurent
Taxonomy articles created by Polbot